This is a list of National Football League punt returners who have led the regular season in punt return yards each year. The record for punt return yards in a season is currently held by Desmond Howard of the Green Bay Packers who had 875 yards in 1996.

Punt return yards leaders
As per Pro Football Reference and The Football Database.

 New NFL Record

References

Punt return yards leaders
National Football League lists